Rigu (also Romanized as Rīgū and Reygū) is a village in Qaleh Qazi Rural District, Qaleh Qazi District, Bandar Abbas County, Hormozgan Province, Iran. At the 2006 census, its population was 44, in 8 families.

References 

Populated places in Bandar Abbas County